Murray Island (also known as Mer Island or Maer Island) in the Torres Strait Island Region, Queensland, Australia. The island is part of the Murray Island Group in the Torres Strait. The town is on the island's northwest coast and within the locality of Mer Island (the locality boundaries are the island's coastline). The island is of volcanic origin, the most easterly inhabited island of the Torres Strait Islands archipelago, just north of the Great Barrier Reef. The name Meer/Mer/Maer comes from the native Meriam language.

The island is populated by the Melanesian Meriam people. There are eight tribes on Mer: Komet, Zagareb, Meuram, Magaram, Geuram, Peibri, Meriam-Samsep, Piadram/Dauer. The island's organisation is based on traditional laws of boundary and ownership.

Geography
Murray Island, in the eastern section of Torres Strait, is a basaltic island formed from an extinct volcano, last active over a million years ago. It formed when the Indo-Australian Plate slid over the East Australia hotspot.

The island's highest point is the  Gelam Paser, the western end of the volcano crater. The island has red fertile soil and is covered in dense vegetation. It has a tropical climate with a wet and dry season.

Murray Island is one of the three islands in the Murray Islands, the others being Daua Island (Dowar) and Waier Island (Waier).

History

Pre-European settlement 

Murray Island has been inhabited for around 2,800 years, the first settlers being Papuo-Austronesians who brought agriculture and pot-making with them. Regular contact between the inhabitants of Torres Strait, Europeans, Asians and other outsiders began once the Torres Strait became a means of passage between the Indian Ocean and the Pacific Ocean in the 19th century.

The inhabitants of the Torres Strait, including the Meriam people, gained a reputation as fierce warriors and skilled mariners. Warfare (both intertribal and against European ships in transit through the Coral Sea) and head hunting were part of Torres Strait Islanders' culture. The account of Jack Ireland, a surviving cabin boy from the Charles Eaton, a barque that was wrecked in 1834 at Detached Reef, near the entrance to Torres Strait, is of interest in this respect. Ireland and another young survivor, William D'Oyley, spent much of their time on Mer before being rescued.

In 1836 a large ceremonial mask was recovered from neighbouring Aureed (Skull) Island after Ireland and D'Oyley were rescued returned to Sydney. The mask was made of turtle shells surrounded by numerous skulls, 17 of which were determined to have belonged to the crew and passengers of the Charles Eaton, who were massacred when they came ashore after the shipwreck. The mask was entered into the collection of the Australian Museum after the skulls were buried on 17 November 1836 in a mass grave in the Devonshire Street Cemetery in Sydney. A monument was erected in the form of a huge altar stone to record the manner in which they died. When the Devonshire Street Cemetery was resumed for the site of the Central Railway Station in 1904 the skulls and the monument were removed to Bunnerong Cemetery at Botany Bay in Sydney.

Post-European settlement (1872) 
Missionaries (mainly Polynesian) and some other Polynesians began to settle the island in 1872 when the London Missionary Society founded a missionary school there. The Queensland Government annexed the islands in 1879. The Australian painter Tom Roberts visited the island in 1892. He witnessed a nighttime dance and depicted it in a painting.

In 1936, a maritime strike fuelled by Islander dissatisfaction with the management of their wages and boats by the Protector of Aborigines allowed Islanders to assert control and reject government controls. In 1937, the inaugural meeting of Island Councillors on Yorke Island resulted in the Torres Strait Islander Act 1939, giving Islanders more authority in their own affairs and establishing local governments on each island.

After the Pacific War broke out in 1941, over 700 Islanders volunteered to defend the Torres Strait. This group was organised into the Torres Strait Light Infantry Battalion. The migration of Islanders to mainland Australia increased as jobs disappeared in the pearling industry. A call for independence from Australia in the 1980s arose as the government failed to provide basic infrastructure on the island.

Murray Island's most famous resident was trade unionist Eddie Mabo, whose decision to sue the Queensland Government to secure ownership of his land, which had been removed from his ancestors by the British colonial powers using the terra nullius legal concept, ultimately led the High Court of Australia, on appeal from the Supreme Court of the State of Queensland, to issue the "Mabo decision"  on 3 June 1992, finally recognising Mabo's native title rights on his land. The decision continues to have ramifications for Australia. Mabo himself died a few months before the decision. After vandalism to his grave site, he was reburied on Murray Island, where Islanders performed a traditional ceremony for the burial of a king.

Culture

The people of Mer maintain their traditional culture. Modern influences such as consumer goods, television, travel and radio are having an impact on traditional practices and culture. Despite this, song and dance remains an integral part of island life and is demonstrated through celebrations such as Mabo Day, Coming of the Light, Tombstone openings and other cultural events. In 2007, after two years of negotiations, the skulls of five Islander tribesmen were returned to Australia from a Glasgow museum where they had been archived for more than 100 years.

The artist Ricardo Idagi was born on Murray Island. Idagi won the main prize at the Western Australian Indigenous Art Awards in 2009.

Language
The people of Murray Island speak Torres Strait Creole and Meriam, a member of the Eastern Trans-Fly languages of Trans–New Guinea; its sister languages being Bini, Wipi and Gizrra. Though it is unrelated to Kalaw Lagaw Ya of the Central and Western Islands of Torres Strait, the two languages share around 40% of their vocabulary. Torres Strait English is a second language.

Governance

Murray Island is governed by the Community Council, which is responsible for roads, water, housing and community events. The Community Council is an integral part of community life. The elders of the community hold a position of respect and also have a major influence on island life.
Queensland's control was moved from just 3 miles, to a large 60 miles offshore. This brought all of Torres Strait that were within a couple hundred meters of New guineas coast, into Queensland. 
The laws rose from requests from the public, who were asking for the lease of islands Queensland's coast. As before this, all islands that were within three miles of the coast, were under Queensland's control. Murray island waited unclaimed until 1879. In 1879, Britain annexed the island to Queensland. The reason for annexation was to protect the British and their property, control the Torres Strait and sea lane to India, dominate fishing and pearling industries and to extend authority to some non-British areas.
Britain also gave all control of Torres Strait islands to Queensland, with no negotiating treaties, in order to avert enemy colonial powers claiming the region.

Notable people
Eddie Mabo, land rights campaigner
Gail Mabo, artist, daughter of Eddie

See also

List of Torres Strait Islands
List of volcanoes in Australia
Murray Island Airport

References

External links
Aboriginal and Torres Strait Islander Social Justice Commissioner, Social Justice Reports 1994–2009 and Native Title Reports 1994–2009 for more information about Aboriginal and Torres Strait Islander affairs

Extinct volcanoes
Headhunting
Pleistocene volcanoes
Torres Strait Islands
Torres Strait Islands communities
Torres Strait Island Region
Volcanoes of Queensland